A Christingle is a symbolic object used in the Advent, Christmas, and Epiphany services of many Christian denominations. Christingle, from a word of German origin, meaning "Little Christ Child", is used to celebrate Jesus Christ as the "Light of the World".

A modern Christingle is made from a candle in an orange (representing the light and the world) which is typically decorated with a red ribbon and sweets or dried fruit. It has been a feature in Moravian churches across the United Kingdom since before the World Wars. As members of Moravian churches moved away from their home congregations, they took the custom of Christingles with them and introduced it to other denominations. In the 1960s John Pensom adopted it as a fundraising tool for The Children's Society of the Church of England.

History
The history of the Christingle can be traced back to Moravian Bishop Johannes de Watteville, who started the tradition in Germany in 1747 as "an attempt to get children to think about Jesus". At that time it was just a red ribbon wrapped around a candle; it is unclear how an orange came to be incorporated into the Christingle.

In the intervening years, the Moravian Church spread the tradition of Christingle through their early role in the Protestant missionary movement.

The custom was popularized in the United Kingdom by John Pensom in 1968. He was raising funds for the charity The Children's Society. In the 2000s, over 5,000 Christingle services, in which children are presented with Christingles, were being held in the UK every year. In 2018, over 6,000 services were held for The Children's Society. Each year, Christingle raises over £1.2 million to help vulnerable young people.

In 2018, The Children's Society launched its #Christingle50 campaign, which included festive services in schools and churches for the 50th year.

Construction

A Christingle usually consists of:
An orange, representing the world
A candle pushed into the centre of the orange, then lit, representing Jesus Christ as Light of the World
A red ribbon wrapped around the orange or a paper frill around the candle, representing the blood of Christ
Dried fruits and/or sweets skewered on cocktail sticks pushed into the orange, representing the fruits of the earth and the four seasons.

Alternate additions to the Christingle include:
Foil wrapped around the candle, to prevent hand burns if candle wax runs down the orange
Cloves studded into the orange, as a replacement for the dried fruits and/or sweets, making it into a modern pomander 
In 2006, Chelmsford Cathedral in the UK announced that it would be replacing the candles with glowsticks, due to concerns of children's hair catching on fire.

See also

Moravian star

References

External links 

 The History and Background of Christingles on whychristmas.com
 What is a Christingle? on christingle.org
 The Christingle Tradition on moravian.org.uk

Advent
Moravian Church
Christian terminology
Oranges (fruit)